This article is a list of events in the year 2005 in Chad.

Incumbents
 President: Idriss Déby
 Prime Minister: Moussa Faki (until February 3), Pascal Yoadimnadji (from February 3)

Events

January 

 January 28 - An outbreak of meningitis occurs in a community of refugees from Darfur.

April 

 April 29 - Chad joins the Arab League as an observer state.

August 

 August 12 - 6 of Hissène Habré's close government connections are removed from their positions in the government.
 August 19 - 4,000 refugees from the Central African Republic enter chad, fleeing from violence.

September 

 September 27 - 46 people are killed in clashes between Sudanese fighters and the Chadian government.

December
 December 23 - President Déby claims that his country is in a state of war with Sudan following rebel attacks.

References

 
2000s in Chad
Years of the 21st century in Chad
Chad
Chad